Battling Bosko is an American animated short film. It is a Looney Tunes cartoon, featuring Bosko, the original star of the series. Like most Looney Tunes of its day, it was directed by Hugh Harman; Frank Marsales provided musical direction. The film was released in 1932, though one source gives an ambiguous date of 1931–1932.

Summary
Pugilist Bosko stands on a chair, merrily boxing his punching bag; at her home, an admiring Honey reads that her sweetheart is going to fight the Champion and turns on the radio to hear the same news, reacting with disdain when the announcer decries Bosko's chances of victory, kissing a small portrait of Bosko as she does so; the Champion, the gigantic Gas House Harry, trains to the delight of his tiny supporters. Bosko's training concludes when he is knocked off his seat by his bag; just then, our hero's telephone rings, Honey, to his delight, being on the other end. She has called to encourage him; he, in turn, reassures her of his chances and the two engage in a scatting duet, eventually joined by Honey's piano. The screen fades.

Outside the stadium, newspapers featuring tidings of the Big Fight are distributed. Stuffed trolleys bear myriads to fill the seats, deflating on the evacuation of their passengers. Honey still sits at home, lightly tickling her piano as the radio sounds: Graham Cracker (a parody of Graham McNamee) announces that the great opposites are entering the ring. We cut to each; Bosko silences his cheering fans to serenade them with a song, at last leaping happily upon the ropes before taking his seat. Gas House Harry laughs derisively at something his manager whispers to him. The names of the competitors are announced and the match begins when the referee, an ostrich, rings the bell by means of a cat's tail. The Champion has the advantage, it seems, knocking the challenger back with a mighty slug. A dazed Bosko's manager rushes to his aid, fanning him and gently spraying him with water until, tickled, he playfully insists that his manager stop it. Back in the brawl, Bosko buffets the Champion such that the ship tattooed on his chest sinks. A hippopotamus-spectator holding a lollipop continually cheers for Bosko. The ostrich-referee is watching closely, occasionally coming between the competitors until they mutually punch him out of the arena after a dance-divertissement. Bosko dodges punch after punch; Honey nervously listens as the radio-announcer states that Bosko is up, then down, then up, then down: we return to the action to find that the Champion is standing upon poor Bosko's feet, punching him repeatedly such that he falls backward only to reascend again to meet the assailant's fist. At last, Bosko seems finished; the count begins. Honey knows what she must do: springing to action, Bruno by her side, she darts out of the house towards the stadium (briefly delayed when a yelping Bruno's tail is caught in the door.) She reaches Bosko's side as the count continues and calls out to him: rousing briefly, bleary-eyed Bosko turns to his sweetheart and then to us with a sleepy "Aw, hot dang!" Reaching for a corner, he draws up a layer of the arena as though it were a blanket, draping it over himself as he falls comfortably asleep.

References

External links
 
 
 Battling Bosko on YouTube (unrestored)

1932 films
1932 animated films
Films scored by Frank Marsales
Films directed by Hugh Harman
Bosko films
Looney Tunes shorts
Warner Bros. Cartoons animated short films
American black-and-white films
1930s Warner Bros. animated short films
American boxing films